The Liverpool and Bury Railway was formed in 1845 and opened on 28 November 1848.  The line ran from Liverpool Exchange first using a joint line with Liverpool, Ormskirk and Preston Railway before branching off to proceed via Kirkby then Wigan and Bolton to Bury.

Mergers
In 1846 the line merged with the Manchester & Leeds Railway being eventually finished after the merger to form the Lancashire and Yorkshire Railway (LYR). The portion of the line west of Crow Nest Junction eventually formed part of the LYR's  Liverpool to Manchester route via a junction with the Manchester and Southport Railway at Wigan. From 1858 the line was connected to the Skelmersdale Branch and the St. Helens Railway at Rainford Junction. A short tunnel was bored through a hill between Upholland station and Orrell station.

The line today
With the exception of the section from Bolton to Bury (closed on 5 October 1970, along with the continuation through to ) the line is still in use, though Liverpool Exchange station closed in 1977 being replaced by Liverpool Moorfields in Merseyrail's Link Tunnel. In 1946 one of the Victorian timber bridges on the line was replaced with the Adam Viaduct, the first prestressed concrete railway bridge in the United Kingdom.

The line from Liverpool city centre to Kirkby is electrified with a DC third rail forming a part of Merseyrail's Northern Line. Long-term aspirations are to extend Merseyrail to Wigan on this line.

In January 2019, Campaign for Better Transport released a report identifying the line between Bolton and Bury which was listed as Priority 2 for reopening. Priority 2 is for those lines which require further development or a change in circumstances (such as housing developments).

In March 2020, a bid was made to the Restoring Your Railway fund to get funds for a feasibility study into reinstating the line between Bolton and Bury. This bid was unsuccessful however a resubmitted bid for the second round was successful.

References

External links

 Liverpool Exchange Disused Stations

Historic transport in Merseyside
Pre-grouping British railway companies
Rail transport in Lancashire
Lancashire and Yorkshire Railway
Railway companies established in 1845
Railway lines opened in 1848
Railway companies disestablished in 1846